The United Friendly Tournament was a women's professional golf tournament on the Ladies European Tour. It was played annually between 1981 and 1984 at various courses in England.

A concurrent tournament, the United Friendly Worthing Open, held 1982–1984 at Hill Barn Golf Club in Worthing, West Sussex, had the same title sponsor.

Winners

Source:

See also
United Friendly Worthing Open

References

External links
Ladies European Tour

Former Ladies European Tour events
Golf tournaments in England
Defunct sports competitions in England
Recurring sporting events established in 1981
Recurring sporting events disestablished in 1984
1981 establishments in England
1984 disestablishments in England